Šarūnas Raudys is head of the Data Analysis Department at the Institute of Mathematics and Informatics in Vilnius, Lithuania. Within the department, he is guiding the data mining and artificial neural networks group. His group's research interests include multivariate analysis, statistical pattern recognition, artificial neural networks, data mining methods and biological information processing systems with applications to analysis of technological, economical and biological problems.

Education 
 USSR Doctor of Sciences, Institute of Electronics and Computer science, Riga, 1978.
 Ph.D. Computer science, Institute Physics and Mathematics, 1969.
 M.S. Electrical and Computer Engineering, Kaunas University of Technology, 1963.
 Panevezys, the  first secondary school, 1958.

Selected publications
 S. Raudys. (2001) Statistical and Neural Classifiers: An integrated approach to design. Springer. London. 312 pages. 
 S. Raudys and Jain K. (1991). Small sample size problems in designing Artificial  Neural Networks. - Artificial Neural Networks and Statistical Pattern Recognition, Old and New Connections, I.K. Sethi and A.K. Jain (Eds), Elsevier Science Publishers B.V, 33-50. 
 S. Raudys. (1984) Statistical Pattern Recognition: Small design sample problems. A monograph, (a manuscript) Institute of  Mathematics and Cybernetics, Vilnius, 480 pages, 30 copies distributed around the world. 
 S. Raudys, (1978) Optimization of nonparametric classification algorithm. Adaptive systems and applications.  Nauka, Novosibirsk, (A.Medvedev Ed.), 57-62.
 S. Raudys. (1976) Limitation of Sample Size in Classification Problems, Inst. of Physics and Mathematics Press, Vilnius. 186 pages.

References 

Lithuanian schoolteachers
Living people
Kaunas University of Technology alumni
Academic staff of Vilnius University
21st-century Lithuanian educators
Year of birth missing (living people)